Aline Terry won the singles tennis title by defeating Augusta Schultz 6–1, 6–3 in the final of the All Comers' tournament of the 1893 U.S. Women's National Singles Championship. Reigning champion Mabel Cahill did not participate and could therefore not defend her title in the challenge round. The tournament was played on outdoor grass courts and held at the Philadelphia Cricket Club in Wissahickon Heights, Chestnut Hill, Philadelphia from June 20 through June 23, 1893.

Draw

All Comers' finals

Notes

References

1893
1893 in American women's sports
June 1893 sports events
Women's Singles
1893 in women's tennis
Women's sports in Pennsylvania
Chestnut Hill, Philadelphia
1893 in Pennsylvania